Celia Marjorie Thomas, Baroness Thomas of Winchester,  (born 14 October 1945 in Winchester, Hants) was a founding member of the Liberal Party in Winchester in the 1960s.

Thomas was appointed a Member of the Order of the British Empire (MBE) in the 1985 Birthday Honours.

On 26 May 2006, she was created a life peer with the title Baroness Thomas of Winchester, of Winchester in the County of Hampshire, and she sits as a Liberal Democrat.

Thomas is a Trustee of the charity Muscular Dystrophy UK, having been a long term sufferer.

References

1945 births
Living people
Life peeresses created by Elizabeth II
Liberal Democrats (UK) life peers 
Members of the Order of the British Empire